Bangkok Love Stories: Innocence is a 2018 segment of the Thai-language television anthology series Bangkok Love Stories, created by Ekachai Uekrongtham and starring Narupornkamol Chaisang, Ten Tosatid Darnkhuntod and Max Nattapol Diloknawarit. The plot is set in Bangkok’s dense, urban Silom district and revolves around a group of characters finding romance.

The first episode was released on March 8, 2018 and the last on November 14, 2018 on GMM 25.

Cast

 Narupornkamol Chaisang as Eve
 Ponlawit Ketprapakorn as Danny
 Pavadee Komchokpaisan as Lyn
 Tosatid Darnkhuntod as Simon
 Max Nattapol Diloknawarit as Keaton
 Nicole Theriault as Jennista
 Tachakorn Boonlupyanun as Mednoon
 Rudklao Amratisha as the mother of Simon
 Naphon Phromsuwan as the doctor
 Teera Pratumtree as the ex of Keaton (?)
 Nida Patcharaveerapong as Claudia
 Kawin Manonukul as JC
 Srikarn Lukgal Nakavisut as Jam
 Radarat Jitprasertngam as Jin (AKA KFC girl)
 Ataporn Suwan as the policeman

Release
Bangkok Love Stories: Innocence was released between March 8, 2018 and February 11, 2018 on GMM 25.

References

External links
 
 

2010s Thai television series
2010s romance television series
2010s comedy television series
Thai romance television series
Thai comedy television series
2018 Thai television series debuts
Thai-language television shows
Bangkok Love Stories